The Wreck is a 1925 American silent melodrama film directed by Ben Wilson and starring Shirley Mason, Malcolm McGregor, and Francis McDonald. It was released on February 5, 1927.

Cast list
 Shirley Mason as Ann
 Malcolm McGregor as Robert
 Francis McDonald as Joe
 James Bradbury Jr.
 Barbara Tennant
 Frances Raymond as Robert's mother

References

External links 
 
 
 

Columbia Pictures films
Films directed by William James Craft
Melodrama films
American silent feature films
American black-and-white films
Silent American drama films
1927 drama films
1927 films
1920s English-language films
1920s American films